Yellowbud (sometimes called Yellow Bud) is an unincorporated community in Ross County, in the U.S. state of Ohio.

History
Yellowbud had its start as a shipping point on the Ohio and Erie Canal. The town site was platted in 1845. With the construction of the railroad, business activity shifted away from inland Yellowbud, and the town's population dwindled. A post office called Yellow Bud was established in 1846, the name was changed to Yellowbud in 1895, and the post office closed in 1903. The community takes its name from Yellowbud Creek.

Notable person
Job E. Stevenson, a U.S. Representative from Ohio, was born at Yellowbud in 1832.

References

Unincorporated communities in Ross County, Ohio
Unincorporated communities in Ohio
1845 establishments in Ohio
Populated places established in 1845